Goodbye Gemini (also released as Twinsanity) is a 1970 British psychological horror film directed by Alan Gibson and starring Judy Geeson, Michael Redgrave, and Martin Potter. Based on the novel Ask Agamemnon by Jenni Hall, it concerns a pair of unusually close fraternal twins, Jacki and Julian, discovering Swinging London while home on Spring Break. Their experiences complicate the pair's relationship, which is already strained due to Julian's incestuous fascination with his sister, which he sees as a natural manifestation of what he believes to be the pair's hive-minded nature.

The film was produced at a time when conservative groups were beginning to react to the perceived social excesses of 1960s British culture. Coincidentally, it was released concurrently with Freddie Francis' Mumsy, Nanny, Sonny and Girly, another horror film which also dealt with an unusual familial relationship and contained a scene implying consensual brother-sister incest. Gemini and Girly were targeted by the conservative press as endemic of everything wrong with contemporary British culture, resulting in protests and theaters refusing to show the films.

Plot
Jacki (Geeson) and Julian (Potter) Dewar, a pair of fraternal twins, arrive via bus in London on Spring break from university, while their father is in Mexico on business. The pair launch themselves into London's underground party scene, clubbing at strip bars, accompanied by Jacki's teddy bear, Agamemnon, whom the twins address—and regard—as a father figure. At one club the pair encounter Clive, a small-time pimp who survives by ingratiating himself with the wealthy and well-connected. Clive quickly endears himself to Jacki, while Clive's sometimes girlfriend Denise attempts to seduce Julian. He turns her down, intent on beginning an incestuous relationship with Jacki. Julian regards he and his sister as two halves of a hive mind, and sees incest as a natural expression of their closeness.

It becomes apparent that Clive is using Jacki and Julian's house to hide from a gangster to whom he owes a large gambling debt. One night after Jacki turns down Julian's advances, Clive plies him with whiskey and marijuana and takes him to a brothel where Clive keeps his "Circus"—a group of transvestite prostitutes who work for him. On Clive's orders, two of the prostitutes anally rape Julian while Clive takes photos.

Clive attempts to blackmail Julian with the photos in order to pay off his gambling debt. Meanwhile, Denise reveals the plan to Jacki, telling her that Clive has similarly raped and blackmailed other men in the past, going to far as to sell some of them into sexual slavery when they were unable to pay him. That night, Jacki comforts Julian, telling him that she knows what happened and that their relationship has not changed.

The next night, the twins bet a drunken Clive that he can't tell the two of them apart. Clive agrees, and the twins quickly dress the room in a ritualistic manner, erecting an "altar" for Agamemnon and dressing themselves in bed sheets altered to look like ceremonial robes. When Clive hesitates in identifying them properly, the twins stab him to death with Jacki's antique Tantōs. In the process of Clive's murder, Agamemnon is cut in half; upon seeing the bear, Jacki suffers a nervous breakdown and she flees, leaving Julian behind.

Jacki is discovered semi-catatonic on a dock by member of parliament James Harrington-Smith, who recognizes her from a party. Jackie, now suffering amnesia, slowly recovers at James' flat as she attempts to piece together what happened the night of Clive's death. Her discovery of Clive's body upon returning home inadvertently causes a citywide manhunt for both siblings; James lies to the police about Jacki's whereabouts the night of the murder, allowing blame to be shifted solely onto Julian.

Deducing that Julian has gone to hide in the same hotel where Clive kept his Circus, Jacki tells James that she'll convince him to turn himself in and to call the police if she hasn't returned after an hour. Jacki confronts Julian, whose mental state is rapidly deteriorating. Julian insists that all of their problems are a result of the pair not engaging in an incestuous relationship, which Julian believes would reinforce their "specialness" to the world. Meanwhile, James, fearful of the potential political scandal that could result from his connection to the twins, decides not to call the police.

Jacki attempts to convince Julian that she'll help him escape London, intending to return to James with information on Julian's whereabouts. An increasingly paranoid and delusional Julian attacks Jacki and crushes her windpipe, killing her. In a moment of lucidity, a distraught Julian apologizes to the dead Jacki before blowing out the room's pilot light and gassing himself to death.

Cast

Production
The film was shot on location in London, including a scene at the Royal Vauxhall Tavern, providing, per producer Peter Snell and star Judy Geeson in an audio commentary recorded in 2009, a snapshot of the London club scene as it existed at the time. At the time of filming, Geeson was at the height of her career following her role in To Sir With Love (1967) with Sidney Poitier; Sir Michael Redgrave, conversely, was near the end of his career. Recently diagnosed with Parkinson's disease, Redgrave would make only four more screen appearances.

The film makes significant divergences from the book, which was highly experimental in nature and involved the use of dream and fantasy sequences written in the style of a Greek tragedy, during which Agamemnon comes to life and interacts with Jacki. Most notably, the film presents the story in chronological order, whereas the book takes place within the frame narrative of an amnesiac Jacki slowly piecing together the events leading up to Clive's death as she convalesces at James' house. The film also places added emphasis on the incestuous undercurrent between Jacki and Julian's relationship, while the book focuses more on Jacki's budding relationship with James and her conflicted feelings about Clive. At the climax, James phones the police, resulting in a strike team laying siege to Julian's hotel room and arresting him before he can harm Jacki. The story ends with Jacki breaking from a fantasy encounter with a wounded but recovering Agamemnon to find James checking in on her.

Soundtrack
The film soundtrack, with music and songs by Christopher Gunning, is a particularly fine period piece with wistfully autumnal instrumentals, mod party background music and quirky but melancholic songs by the likes of The Peddlers,  Jackie Lee and Peter Lee Stirling (aka Daniel Boone). The original soundtrack issued in 1970 on DJM Records had become a sought after collector's item in recent years until it was reissued on CD by Harkit Records in 2005.

Release
The film was released theatrically in London on 6 August 1970. It was released in the United States the following month, opening at drive-in theaters in Passaic, New Jersey on 23 September 1970. In Los Angeles, the film was released on 2 December 1970, paired as a double bill with The Bird with the Crystal Plumage.

Home media
Scorpion Releasing released a DVD edition of the film in January 2010. A limited edition Blu-ray was released in coordination with Screen Archives Entertainment on 24 March 2016, limited to 1,000 units.

References

Sources

External links
 

1970 horror films
1970s horror thriller films
1970 films
British horror thriller films
British LGBT-related films
Cross-dressing in film
Films set in London
Films shot in London
1970s English-language films
Films directed by Alan Gibson
Films scored by Christopher Gunning
LGBT-related horror thriller films
Twins in fiction
1970s British films